The 120s decade ran from January 1, 120, to December 31, 129.

Significant people
 Hadrian, Roman Emperor (117–138)

References